USS Essex (CV/CVA/CVS-9) was an aircraft carrier and the lead ship of the 24-ship  built for the United States Navy during World War II. She was the fourth US Navy ship to bear the name. Commissioned in December 1942, Essex participated in several campaigns in the Pacific Theater of Operations, earning the Presidential Unit Citation and 13 battle stars. Decommissioned shortly after the end of the war, she was modernized and recommissioned in the early 1950s as an attack carrier (CVA), eventually becoming an antisubmarine aircraft carrier (CVS). In her second career, she served mainly in the Atlantic, playing a role in the Cuban Missile Crisis. She also participated in the Korean War, earning four battle stars and the Navy Unit Commendation. She was the primary recovery carrier for the Apollo 7 space mission.

She was decommissioned for the last time in 1969 and sold by the Defense Reutilization and Marketing Service (DRMS) for scrap on 1June 1973.

Construction and Commissioning 
After an accelerated construction, she was launched on 31 July 1942, sponsored by Mrs. Artemus L. Gates, the wife of the Assistant Secretary of the Navy for Air. She was commissioned on 31December 1942, with Captain Donald B. Duncan commanding.

Service history

World War II 
Following her accelerated builder's trials and shakedown cruise, Essex moved to the Pacific in May 1943. Departing from Pearl Harbor, she participated with Task Force 16 (TF 16) in carrier operations against Marcus Island. On 31August 1943, she was designated the flagship of TF14 and struck Wake Island on 5and6 October. She then launched an attack with Task Group 50.3 (TG50.3) against the Gilbert Islands where she took part in her first amphibious assault during the Battle of Tarawa. After refueling at sea, she cruised as the flagship of TG50.3 to attack Kwajalein on 4 December. Her second amphibious assault delivered in company with TG50.3 was against the Marshall Islands on 29January to 2February 1944.

Essex, in TG50.3, now joined with TG58.1 and TG58.2 to constitute Task Force 58, the "Fast Carrier Task Force", launched an attack against Truk between 17and 18February 1944 during which eight Japanese ships were sunk. While en route to the Mariana Islands to sever Japanese supply lines, the carrier force was detected and subjected to a prolonged aerial attack which it repelled successfully. It then continued with the scheduled attack upon Saipan, Tinian, and Guam on 23February 1944.

After this operation, Essex proceeded to San Francisco for her single wartime overhaul. Following her overhaul, Essex became the carrier for Air Group 15, the "Fabled Fifteen," commanded by the U.S. Navy's top ace of the war, David McCampbell. She deployed with TF58 to support the occupation of the Marianas on 12June to10 August; sortied with TG38.3 to lead an attack against the Palau Islands on 6to 8September, and Mindanao on 9to 10September with enemy shipping as the main target, and remained in the area to support landings on Peleliu. On 2October, she weathered a typhoon and four days later departed with Task Force 38(TF 38) for the Ryukyus.

For the remainder of 1944, she continued her frontline action, participating in strikes against Okinawa on 1October, and Formosa from 1to 14October, covering the Leyte landings, taking part in the Battle of Leyte Gulf 24to 25October, and continuing the search for enemy fleet units until 30October, when she returned to Ulithi, Caroline Islands, for replenishment. She resumed the offensive and delivered attacks on Manila and the northern Philippine Islands during November. On 25November, for the first time in her far-ranging operations and destruction to the enemy, Essex received damage. A kamikaze hit the port edge of her flight deck landing among planes gassed for takeoff causing extensive damage, killing 15, and wounding 44.

Following quick repairs, she operated with the task force off Leyte supporting the occupation of Mindoro 14to 16December 1944. She rode out Typhoon Cobra and made a special search for survivors afterward. With TG38.3, she participated in the Lingayen Gulf operations, launched strikes against Formosa, Sakishima, Okinawa, and Luzon. Entering the South China Sea in search of enemy surface forces, the task force pounded shipping and conducted strikes on Formosa, the China coast, Hainan, and Hong Kong. Essex withstood the onslaught of the third typhoon in four months on 20and 21January 1945 before striking again at Formosa, Miyako-jima, and Okinawa on 26and 27January.

For the remainder of the war, she operated with TF58, conducting attacks against the Tokyo area on 16and 17February. On 25February 1945, she was deployed to neutralize the enemy's air power before the landings on Iwo Jima and to cripple the aircraft manufacturing industry. She sent support missions against Iwo Jima and neighboring islands, but from 23March to 28May was employed primarily to support the conquest of Okinawa. In the closing days of the war, Essex took part in the final telling raids against the Japanese home islands on 10July to 15August 1945.

Recommission
Following the surrender of Japan, she continued defensive combat air patrols until 3 September, when she was ordered to Bremerton, Washington, for inactivation. She arrived at Puget Sound on 15 September. On 9January 1947, she was decommissioned and placed in reserve. Modernization endowed Essex with a new flight deck, and a streamlined island superstructure on 16 January 1951, when she was recommissioned, with Captain A. W. Wheelock commanding.

Korean War 
After a brief cruise in Hawaiian waters, she began the first of three tours in Far Eastern waters during the Korean War. She served as flagship for Carrier Division 1 (CarDiv 1) and Task Force 77. She was the first carrier to launch F2H Banshees on combat missions; on 16September 1951, one of these planes, damaged in combat, crashed into aircraft parked on the forward flight deck, causing an explosion and fire which killed seven. After repairs at Yokosuka, she returned to frontline action on 3October to launch strikes up to the Yalu River and provide close air support for U.N. troops. Her two deployments in the Korean War were from August 1951March 1952 and July 1952January 1953.

On 1December 1953, she started her final tour of the war, sailing in the East China Sea with what official U.S. Navy records describe as the "Peace Patrol".

Pacific Fleet 
The United States eventually decided to not join the fighting.

From November 1954 – June 1955 she engaged in training exercises, operated for three months with the United States Seventh Fleet, assisted in the Tachen Islands evacuation, and engaged in air operations and fleet maneuvers off Okinawa.

In July 1955, Essex entered Puget Sound Naval Shipyard for repairs and extensive alterations. The SCB-125 modernization program included installation of an angled flight deck and an enclosed hurricane bow, as well as relocation of the aft elevator to the starboard deck edge. Modernization completed, she rejoined the Pacific Fleet in March 1956. For the next 14 months, the carrier operated off the West Coast, except for a six-month cruise with the 7th Fleet in the Far East.

Ordered to join the Atlantic Fleet for the first time in her long career, she sailed from San Diego on 21June 1957, rounded Cape Horn, and arrived at Naval Station Mayport on 1 August.

Atlantic and Mediterranean 
In the fall of 1957, Essex participated as an anti-submarine carrier in the NATO Exercise Strikeback and in February 1958, deployed with the 6th Fleet until May, when she shifted to the eastern Mediterranean. Alerted to the Middle East crisis on 14July 1958, she sped to support the US landings in Beirut, Lebanon, launching reconnaissance and patrol missions until 20August. Once again, she was ordered to proceed to Asian waters and transited the Suez Canal to arrive in the Taiwan operational area, where she joined TF77 in conducting flight operations before rounding the Horn and proceeding back to Mayport. Essex joined with the 2nd Fleet and British ships in Atlantic exercises and with NATO forces in the eastern Mediterranean during the fall of 1959. In December she aided victims of a disastrous flood at Fréjus, France.

In the spring of 1960, she was converted into an ASW Support Carrier and was thereafter homeported at Quonset Point, Rhode Island. Since that time, she operated as the flagship of Carrier Division 18 and Antisubmarine Carrier Group Three. She conducted rescue and salvage operations off the New Jersey coast for a downed blimp, cruised with midshipmen, and was deployed on NATO and CENTO exercises that took her through the Suez Canal into the Indian Ocean. Ports of call included Karachi and the British Crown Colony of Aden. In November she joined the French navy in Operation "Jet Stream".

On 7November 1960, the Soviet research vessel  was reported by TASS to have been buzzed in the Arabian Sea by a Grumman S-2F Tracker from Essex. The United States Navy denied that the aircraft was buzzing the ship, claiming it was merely establishing her identity.

Bay of Pigs and Cuban Missile Crisis 
In April 1961, Essex steamed out of Quonset Point on a two-week "routine training" cruise, purportedly to support the carrier qualification of a squadron of Navy pilots. Twelve A4D Skyhawks from VA-34 stationed at NAS Cecil Field, Florida flew aboard. VS-34 aircraft had been removed to make room for VA-34's aircraft. VA-34's support enlisted crew flew aboard in C1A COD aircraft. The A4D-2 were armed with 2 20mm Mk-12 cannons loaded with "service" ammo and one LAU-3a 19 shot 2.75 FFAR pod with "anti-tank" warheads mounted on the centerline ejector rack, Station 3. After several days at sea, all their identifying markings were crudely obscured with flat gray paint. They began flying two aircraft missions day only. Not generally known to Essex crew was that they had been tasked to provide air support to CIA-sponsored bombers during the ill-fated Bay of Pigs Invasion. Cuba's leader Castro knew the Essex was off the Cuban Coast but the US Navy denied that claim. The naval aviation part of the mission was aborted by President John F. Kennedy at the last moment and the Essex crew was sworn to secrecy. Returning home and while at sea VA-34's aircraft hastily repainted "national stars and bars" by all available enlisted personnel, then flew off and landed at NAS Jacksonville, Florida and underwent professional repainting at the NARF Naval Aviation Rework facility. The planes then flew a few miles over to her home base at NAS Cecil Field. The entire VA-34 crew was sworn to secrecy. In 1967-68 VA-34's crew was awarded the Navy and Marine Expeditionary medal.

Later in 1961, Essex completed a "People to People" cruise to Northern Europe with ports of call in Rotterdam, Hamburg, and Greenock. During the Hamburg visit over one million visitors toured Essex. During her departure, Essex almost ran aground in the shallow Elbe River. On her return voyage to the United States she ran into a severe North Atlantic storm (January 1962) and suffered major structural damage. In early 1962, she went into dry dock in the Brooklyn Navy Yard for a major overhaul.

Essex had just finished her six-month-long overhaul and was at Guantanamo Bay Naval Base for sea trials when President Kennedy placed a naval "quarantine" on Cuba in October 1962, in response to the discovered presence of Soviet missiles in that country (see Cuban Missile Crisis). The word "quarantine" was used rather than "blockade" for reasons of international law, Kennedy reasoned that a blockade would be an act of war, and war had not been declared between the U.S. and Cuba. Essex spent over a month in the Caribbean as one of the US Navy ships enforcing this "quarantine", returning home just before Thanksgiving.

Nautilus incident 

While conducting replenishment exercises with NATO forces on 10 November 1966, Essex collided with the submerged submarine . The submarine sustained extensive sail damage, returning to port unassisted. Aboard Essex, the hull was opened, and the ship's speed indicator equipment was destroyed, but the carrier was still able to make port unassisted. Essex subsequently reported to the Boston Naval Shipyard for an extensive overhaul and hull repairs.

Tupolev Tu-16 incident 
On 25 May 1968, Essex was underway in the Norwegian Sea when she was buzzed four times by a Soviet Tupolev Tu-16 heavy bomber. On the fourth pass, the plane's wing clipped the surface of the sea, and the aircraft disintegrated. The Essex launched rescue helicopters but none of the three crew on board survived.

Apollo missions 
Essex was scheduled to be the prime recovery carrier for the ill-fated Apollo 1 space mission. She was to pick up Apollo1 astronauts north of Puerto Rico on 7March 1967 after a 14-day spaceflight. However, the mission did not take place because on 27January 1967, the Apollo1s crew was killed by a flash fire in their spacecraft on LC-34 at the Cape Canaveral Air Force Station, Florida.

Essex was the prime recovery carrier for the Apollo 7 mission. She recovered the Apollo 7 crew on 22October 1968 after a splashdown north of Puerto Rico.

Essex was the main vessel on which future Apollo 11 astronaut Neil Armstrong served during the Korean War.

Decommissioning and disposal 
Essex was decommissioned on 30June 1969 at Boston Navy Yard. She was struck from the Naval Vessel Register on 1June 1973 and sold by the Defense Reutilization and Marketing Service (DRMS) for scrapping on 1June 1975. Essex was scrapped at Kearny, New Jersey.

Awards

Gallery

In Popular Culture 
During the 4 March 1974 broadcast of his WOR-AM radio show, Jean Shepherd, who wrote the book on which the movie A Christmas Story is based (as well as providing the voice-over), describes daily life aboard Essex and tells how he there met Robert Gaffney, who would later direct Frankenstein Meets the Space Monster.

Notes

References

Bibliography

Further reading

External links 

 Navy photographs of Essex (CV-9)
 
 USS Essex Association
 War Service Fuel Consumption of U.S. Naval Surface Vessels FTP 218

 

Essex-class aircraft carriers
1942 ships
World War II aircraft carriers of the United States
Cold War aircraft carriers of the United States
Korean War aircraft carriers of the United States
Ships built in Newport News, Virginia
Space capsule recovery ships